Alan Michael Sugar, Baron Sugar (born 24 March 1947) is a British business magnate, media personality, author, politician and political adviser. In 1968, he started what would later become his largest business venture, consumer electronics company Amstrad. In 2007, he sold his remaining interest in the company in a deal to BSkyB for £125M.

Sugar was the chairman and part-owner of Tottenham Hotspur from 1991 to 2001, selling his remaining stake in the club in 2007 as well, for £25m. He is also known for being the host and "Boss" for the BBC reality competition series The Apprentice, which has been broadcast every year, with the exception of 2020, since 2005. He also assumed the role for The Celebrity Apprentice Australia for Australia's Nine Network in 2021.

According to the Sunday Times Rich List, Sugar became a billionaire in 2015. In 2021, his fortune was estimated at £1.21bn, ranking him as the 138th-richest person in the UK.

Early life
Sugar was born on 24 March 1947 in Hackney, East London, into a Jewish family. His father, Nathan, was a tailor in the garment industry of the East End. His maternal grandparents were born in Russia, and his paternal grandfather was born in Poland. Sugar's paternal grandmother, Sarah Sugar, was born in London to Polish parents.

When Sugar was young, his family lived in a council flat. Because of his profuse, curly hair, he was nicknamed "Mop head," a name that he still goes by in the present day. He attended Northwold Primary School and then Brooke House Secondary School in Upper Clapton, Hackney, and made extra money by working at a greengrocers. After leaving school at the age of sixteen, he worked briefly for the civil service as a statistician at the Ministry of Education.

Amstrad
In 1968, aged 21, Sugar set up Amstrad with £100 of Post Office savings. He started off selling radio aerials for cars and other electrical goods out of a van which he had bought for £50 and insured for £8.

The name of the company was formed from his initials and the first four letters of the word trading: Alan Michael Sugar Trading. It began as a general importer/exporter and wholesale; by 1970 the first manufacturing venture was underway. He achieved lower production prices by using injection moulding plastics for hi-fi turntable covers, severely undercutting competitors who used vacuum-forming processes. Manufacturing capacity was expanded to include the production of audio amplifiers and tuners.

In 1980, Amstrad was listed on the London Stock Exchange and during the 1980s Amstrad doubled its profit and market value every year. By 1984, recognising the opportunity of the home computer era, Amstrad launched an 8-bit machine, the Amstrad CPC 464. Although the CPC range were attractive machines, with CP/M-capability and a good BASIC interpreter, it had to compete with its arch-rivals, the more graphically complex Commodore 64 and the popular Sinclair ZX Spectrum, not to mention the highly sophisticated BBC Micro. Despite this, three million units were sold worldwide with a long production life of eight years. It inspired an East German version with Z80 clone processors. In 1985, Sugar had another major breakthrough with the launch of the Amstrad PCW 8256 word processor which retailed at over £300, but was still considerably cheaper than rival machines (such as the Apple Macintosh Plus, which retailed at $2599). In 1986 Amstrad bought the rights to the Sinclair computer product line and produced two more ZX Spectrum models in a similar style to their CPC machines. It also developed the PC1512, a PC compatible computer, which became quite popular in Europe and was the first in a line of Amstrad PCs.

In 1988, Stewart Alsop II called Sugar and Jack Tramiel "the world's two leading business-as-war entrepreneurs". The 1990s proved a difficult time for the company. The launch of a range of business PCs was marred by unreliable hard disks (supplied by Seagate), causing high levels of customer dissatisfaction and damaging Amstrad's reputation in the personal computer market, from which it never recovered. Subsequently, Seagate was ordered to pay Amstrad $153 million in damages for lost revenue. This was later reduced by $22 million in an out of court settlement. In the early 1990s, Amstrad began to focus on portable computers rather than desktop computers. Also, in 1990, Amstrad entered the gaming market with the Amstrad GX4000, but it was a commercial failure, largely because there was only a poor selection of games available. Additionally, it was immediately superseded by the Japanese consoles: Mega Drive and Super NES, which both had a much more comprehensive selection of games. In 1993, Amstrad released the PenPad, a PDA, and bought into Betacom and Viglen in order to focus more on telecommunications rather than computers. Amstrad released the first of its combined telephony and e-mail devices, called the e-m@iler, followed by the e-m@ilerplus in 2002, neither of which sold in great volume.

On 31 July 2007, it was announced that broadcaster BSkyB had agreed to buy Amstrad for about £125m. At the time of the takeover, Sugar commented that he wished to play a part in the business, saying: "I turn 60 this year and I have had 40 years of hustling in the business, but now I have to start thinking about my team of loyal staff, many of whom have been with me for many years." On 2 July 2008 it was announced that Sugar was standing down from Amstrad as chairman, to focus on his other business interests.

Tottenham Hotspur
After a take-over battle with Robert Maxwell, Sugar teamed up with Terry Venables and bought Tottenham Hotspur football club in June 1991. Although Sugar's initial investment helped ease the financial troubles the club was suffering at the time, his treatment of Tottenham as a business venture and not a footballing one made him an unpopular figure among the Spurs fans. In Sugar's nine years as chairman, Tottenham Hotspur did not finish in the top six in the league and won just one trophy, the 1999 Football League Cup.

After Venables was sacked by Sugar, Venables appealed to the high courts for reinstatement. A legal battle for the club took place over the summer, which Sugar won (see Re Tottenham Hotspur plc [1994] 1 BCLC 655). The decision to sack Venables angered many of Tottenham fans, and Sugar later said, "I felt as though I'd killed Bambi."

In 1992, he was the only representative of the then big five (Arsenal, Everton, Liverpool, Manchester United and Tottenham) who voted in favour of Sky's bid for Premier League television rights. The other four voted in favour of ITV's bid, as it had promised to show big fives games more often. At the time of the vote, Sugar's company Amstrad was developing satellite dishes for Sky, though Sugar had declared this prior to the vote. During negotiations, Sugar called Sky CEO Sam Chisholm and angrily ordered him to "blow [ITV] out of the water" with a much higher bid.

In 1994, Sugar financed the transfers of three stars of the 1994 World Cup: Ilie Dumitrescu, Gica Popescu, and most notably Jürgen Klinsmann, who had an excellent first season in English football, being named Footballer of the Year. Because Spurs had not qualified for the UEFA Cup, Klinsmann decided to invoke an opt-out clause in his contract and left for Bayern Munich in the summer of 1995. Sugar appeared on television holding the last shirt Klinsmann wore for Spurs and said he wouldn't wash his car with it. He referred to foreigners coming into the Premier League at high wages as "Carlos Kickaballs". Klinsmann retaliated by calling Sugar "a man without honour", and said:

"He only ever talks about money. He never talks about the game. I would say there is a big question mark over whether Sugar's heart is in the club and in football. The big question is what he likes more, the business or the football?" Klinsmann re-signed for Tottenham on loan in December 1997.

In October 1998, former Tottenham striker Teddy Sheringham released his autobiography, in which he attacked Sugar as the reason he left Tottenham in 1997. Sheringham said Sugar had accused him of feigning injury during a long spell on the sidelines during the 1993/1994 season. He wrote that Sugar had refused to give him the five-year contract he wanted, as he had not believed Sheringham would still get into the Tottenham team when he was 36. Sheringham returned to Tottenham after his spell at Manchester United and continued to start for the first team until he was released in the summer of 2003, at age 37. Sheringham said that Sugar lacked ambition and was hypocritical. As an example, Sugar asked him for recommendations of players; when Sheringham suggested England midfielder Paul Ince, Sugar refused because he did not want to spend £4 million on a player who would soon be 30. After Sheringham left Spurs, Sugar approved the signing of Les Ferdinand, aged 31, for a club record £6 million, on higher wages than Sheringham had wanted.

Sugar appointed seven managers in his time at Spurs. The first was Peter Shreeves, followed by the dual management team of Doug Livermore and Ray Clemence, former Spurs midfielder Osvaldo Ardiles, and up and coming young manager Gerry Francis. In 1997, Sugar surprised the footballing world by appointing the relatively unknown Swiss manager Christian Gross. Gross lasted 9 months as Spurs finished in 14th place in 1998, and began the next season with just 3 points from their opening three games. Sugar next appointed George Graham, a former player and manager of bitter rivals Arsenal. Despite his earning Tottenham's first trophy in 8 years, the Spurs fans never warmed to Graham, partly because of his Arsenal connections. They disliked the negative, defensive style of football which he had Spurs playing; fans claimed it was not the "Tottenham way".

In February 2001, after speculation and confirmation on 11 December 2000, Sugar sold his majority stake at Tottenham to leisure group ENIC, selling 27% of the club for £22 million. In June 2007, Sugar sold his 12% remaining shares to ENIC for £25 million, ending his 16-year association with the club. He has described his time at Tottenham as "a waste of my life". Sugar later donated £3 million from the proceeds of the sale of his interests in Tottenham Hotspur to the refurbishment of the Hackney Empire in his native East End of London.

The Apprentice
Sugar became the star of the BBC reality show The Apprentice, which has had one series broadcast each year from 2005, in the same role as Donald Trump in the US version. Sugar fires at least one candidate each week until only one candidate is left. Until 2010, the winner was then employed in his company and since 2011 wins a partnership with Sugar, including his investment of £250,000 to establish their own business.

As a condition for appearing in the third series, Sugar placed a requirement that the show be more business-oriented rather than just entertainment and that he should be portrayed in a less harsh light, to counter his somewhat belligerent reputation. He also expressed a desire that the calibre of the candidates should be higher than those who had appeared in the second series (who had come across as manifestly lacklustre) and that the motives of the candidates for participating are scrutinised more carefully, given that certain of the candidates in previous series had used their successful experience in the show as a springboard to advance their own careers (as occurred with Michelle Dewberry, the winner of the second series, who left Amstrad's employment only 8 months after taking up the job). In September 2013, Sugar lost his Employment tribunal counter-claim against Stella English, the 2010 winner of The Apprentice.

Sugar has criticised the US version of The Apprentice because "they've made the fatal error of trying to change things just for the sake of it and it backfired."

The Celebrity Apprentice Australia
In September 2020, it was announced that Sugar will be the new CEO on The Celebrity Apprentice Australia on Australia's Nine Network, replacing former CEO Mark Bouris.

Young Apprentice
Young Apprentice (Junior Apprentice in series 1) was a British reality television programme spin-off in which a group of twelve young people, aged 16 and 17, competed to win a £25,000 prize from Sugar. The six-part series began on BBC One and BBC HD on Wednesday, 12 May 2010, and concluded on Thursday, 10 June of the same year. It featured Nick Hewer and Karren Brady as Sugar's advisors. Karren Brady made her debut on Junior Apprentice; it aired before she appeared on the adult version. The programme concluded with Sugar awarding the prize fund to 17-year-old Arjun Rajyagor. Tim Ankers finished in second place.

The second series started in October 2011, and featured eight episodes and twelve contestants. The series was won by Zara Brownless, with James McCullough as runner-up.

Originally proposed in March 2008 and confirmed in June 2009, Junior Apprentice received mostly positive reviews from critics. Sugar's role under Gordon Brown's government sparked a debate over the BBC's political impartiality regulations in the run-up to the UK 2010 election, resulting in both Junior Apprentice and the sixth regular edition of The Apprentice being delayed.

Other Television appearances
In May 2008, Sugar made an appearance on An Audience Without Jeremy Beadle to pay tribute to Jeremy Beadle as they were close friends and both appeared on a celebrity special of Who Wants to Be a Millionaire? in 2005.

In January 2009, Fiona Bruce presented a BBC Two documentary entitled The Real Sir Alan. Also in 2009, Sugar appeared in television advertisements for investment bank NS&I and The Learning and Skills Council talking about apprenticeships.

In May 2011, Sugar presented Lord Sugar Tackles Football, a documentary looking into the financial woes of English football.

In September 2012, Sugar appeared as himself in a cameo in the Doctor Who episode "The Power of Three". Sugar's cameo was filmed on the set of The Apprentice.

In November 2012, Sugar appeared as himself in a cameo in a special episode of EastEnders for Children in Need.

Other ventures

Amsair
Amsair Executive Aviation was founded in 1993, and is run by Sugar's son Daniel Paul Sugar. As with Amstrad, the name Amsair is an acronym taken from the initials of Sugar's name "Alan Michael Sugar Air." Amsair operates a large Cessna fleet, and one Embraer Legacy 650 with the registration G-SUGA, offering business and executive jet charters.

Amsprop
Amsprop is a property investment firm owned by Sugar and is now controlled by his son Daniel Paul Sugar.

Simon Ambrose, winner of the 2007 series of The Apprentice, started working for Amsprop Estates after the series finished. However, in April 2010, he was reported to be leaving to start his own venture.

Viglen Ltd
Sugar was the owner (and Chairman of the board) of Viglen Ltd, an IT services provider catering primarily to the education and public sector. He resigned his position on 1 July 2009. Following the sale of Amstrad PLC to BSkyB, Viglen was Sugar's sole IT establishment until its sale to XMA in 2014.

Amscreen

Sugar is Chairman of Amscreen, a company run by his eldest son Simon Sugar, specialising in selling advertising space on digital signage screens that it provides to retailers, medical centres and leisure venues. Apprentice winner Yasmina Siadatan worked there, selling into the NHS.

The screens use a Face detection system called OptimEyes to try to identify age and sex of its viewers.

In July 2008, Amscreen purchased Comtech M2M, which was founded in September 1992, originally specialising in communications product retailing. This was before entering the M2M market in 1999. On 29 August 2008, Comtech M2M officially changed names to Amscreen Limited.

YouView
On 7 March 2011, Sugar replaced Kip Meek on the board of the BBC initiated IPTV project known as YouView (formerly known as Project Canvas) which is also backed by ITV, Channel 4 and Channel 5 and broadband providers including BT and TalkTalk. Sugar was paid £500,000 for chairing YouView for the year ending March 2012.

Political involvement
In February 2009, the Evening Standard journalist Andrew Gilligan claimed that Sugar had been approached to be the Labour candidate for Mayor of London in 2012. Sugar subsequently ridiculed the claim in an interview with The Guardian. But, during Prime Minister Gordon Brown's cabinet reshuffle on 5 June 2009, the BBC reported that Sugar would be given a life peerage and had been offered a job as the government's "Enterprise Champion". On 7 June 2009, Sugar sought to clarify the non-political nature of his appointment. He stated that he would not be joining the government, that the appointment was politically neutral, and that all he wanted to do was help businesses and entrepreneurs. On 20 July 2009, he was made Baron Sugar, of Clapton, in the London Borough of Hackney. He made his maiden speech in the House of Lords on 25 November 2009.

In August 2014, Sugar was one of 200 public figures who were signatories to a letter to The Guardian expressing their hope that Scotland would vote to remain part of the United Kingdom in September's referendum on that issue.

From 1997 until 2015, Sugar was a member of the Labour Party and also one of its largest donors. On 11 May 2015, four days after the 2015 United Kingdom general election, he announced that he was leaving the party. He issued a statement to say:

Before the 2016 London mayoral election, Sugar claimed that he is popular politically, and repeatedly urged the public to not vote for Sadiq Khan. Khan won.

For the United Kingdom European Union membership referendum, 2016, he endorsed the "Remain" campaign. In May 2017, Sugar endorsed Theresa May for the 2017 United Kingdom general election.

During a June 2017 radio interview with LBC's Nick Ferrari, Sugar said when asked about the 2017 election results that "it's very, very surprising. I think I'd join a lot of people when I say the Theresa May and Conservative campaign was very lacking in what they were going to offer the public" and that "Jeremy Corbyn did a very good job wooing the young and educated people. I would add that those people who voted for him are quite bright and educated, but also not very experienced in life".

On 31 March 2018, after complaints from Labour politicians, Sugar deleted a tweet showing an edited image of Labour leader Jeremy Corbyn in a car with Adolf Hitler. The incident occurred after Corbyn said the party "must do better" in resolving the party's problems with antisemitism. Shadow Chancellor John McDonnell had urged him to "delete and disown" the tweet. Sugar responded that he was "not the originator" and that "There is no smoke without fire in Labour".

On 5 April 2018, Sugar published an ode critical of the UK's Labour Party leader Jeremy Corbyn.

In December 2018, Sugar announced during a television interview that he would leave Britain if Corbyn became prime minister.

Sugar endorsed Boris Johnson during the 2019 Conservative Party leadership election. He later endorsed the Conservative Party in the 2019 general election.

Personal life
Sugar has stated that he is an atheist, but remains proud of his Jewish heritage. Sugar and his now wife, Ann Simons, a former hairdresser, married on 28 April 1968 at Great Portland Street, London. They have two sons and a daughter. The couple live in Chigwell, Essex.
Sugar owns a four-seat Cirrus SR22 aircraft and a 13-seat Embraer Legacy 650 jet. During an attempted landing in his Cirrus at the grass airfield City Airport Manchester on 5 July 2008, Sugar overshot the runway after touchdown due to poor weather and wet field conditions. No injuries were sustained, although the plane was slightly damaged and consequently grounded.

Sugar is a prominent supporter and former owner of Tottenham Hotspur football club.

In February 2009, it was reported that Sugar had initiated legal proceedings against The Sun newspaper following a report that he had been named on a "hit list" of British Jews in response to Israel's ongoing military operation in Gaza. The threats are alleged to have been made by Glen Jenvey, the source of the original story in The Sun, who posted to a Muslim website under a false identity. On 10 June 2020, Sugar, a pilot since 1975, announced on Twitter that he was taking delivery of a new 2020 Cirrus SR22T single-engine aircraft from the United States where he owns a Florida home and multiple boats, including a refurbished one named Little Tub and a superyacht.

In 2015, Sugar had an estimated fortune of £1.04 billion (US$1.58 billion).

In December 2020, he announced that both his brother and sister had died from COVID-19.

In February 2022, 70-year-old Patrick Gomes was jailed for three years and six months for sending antisemitic death threats to Sugar, in response to him speaking about antisemitism in the Labour Party.

Honours and philanthropy

Sugar was knighted in the 2000 New Year Honours "for services to the Home Computer and Electronics Industry". He holds two honorary Doctorates of Science, awarded in 1988 by City University and in 2005 by Brunel University. He is a philanthropist for charities such as Jewish Care and Great Ormond Street Hospital, and donated £200,000 to the British Labour Party in 2001. Sugar was created a life peer as Baron Sugar, of Clapton in the London Borough of Hackney on 20 July 2009. On 29 October 2015, Sugar was listed by UK-based company Richtopia at number 5 in the list of 100 Most Influential British Entrepreneurs. In 2017 he ranked number 1 in the Essex Power 100 list and was named the most powerful person in Essex.

Controversy

Sex discrimination law
Sugar has been accused of having an "outdated" attitude towards women. Regarding the 1970s UK law which states that it is discriminatory and hence illegal for women to be asked at interview whether they plan to have children, Sugar is quoted as saying "These laws are counter-productive for women, that's the bottom line. You're not allowed to ask, so it's easy – just don't employ them. It will get harder to get a job as a woman."

Tweets

On 30 September 2013, Sugar tweeted a picture of Chinese child crying 'because he was told off for leaving production line of iPhone 5'. The message was investigated by the Merseyside police force's specialist hate crime investigation team, who decided that it should be classed as a "hate incident" although no crime had taken place.

On 20 June 2018, Sugar tweeted a picture of the Senegal national football team edited next to images of fake handbags and sunglasses, claiming that some of the players looked just like hawkers he had encountered in Marbella. He later defended his tweet as a joke before taking it down, after accusations of racism.

See also
 What You See is What You Get: My Autobiography, Sugar's autobiography

References

Further reading
 David Thomas, "Alan Sugar – the Amstrad Story" (1991), paperback .
 Alan Sugar, "The Apprentice: How to get hired not fired"
 Alan Sugar, "What You See Is What You Get: My Autobiography" (2010), hardback .

External links

 

1947 births
Living people
English aviators
English autobiographers
English football chairmen and investors
English people of Russian-Jewish descent
English people of Polish-Jewish descent
English billionaires
English television personalities
English atheists
Jewish atheists
British real estate businesspeople
British billionaires
Knights Bachelor
People from Hackney Central
The Apprentice (British TV series)
BBC people
Labour Party (UK) life peers
Tottenham Hotspur F.C. directors and chairmen
Labour Party (UK) people
20th-century English businesspeople
21st-century English businesspeople
Jewish British politicians
Businesspeople awarded knighthoods
Life peers created by Elizabeth II
People associated with Brunel University London